Bohemia is the third studio album by English electronic music producer Ils. It was released by Distinct'ive Records on 9 May 2005, with a following remix album, Bohemia - Remixes & Exclusives releasing two years later.

Track listing
 "Intro (Reprise)" - 2:09
 "Tiny Toy" - 5:41
 "Angels" - 5:25
 "Cherish" - 4:43
 "Feed the Addiction" - 4:38
 "Ill-Logic" - 5:51
 "Storm from the East" - 5:59
 "Precious" - 3:32
 "Razorblade" - 4:16
 "The World Is Yours" - 3:42
 "Loving You" - 4:13
 "West Coast" - 5:16
 "Over My Head" - 4:57

In other media
The song "Feed the Addiction" appeared in the 2005 video game Need For Speed: Most Wanted.

References

Ils (producer) albums
2005 albums
Distinct'ive Records albums